Fürth-Unterfarrnbach station is a railway station in the city of Fürth, located in Bavaria, Germany. The station is on the Nuremberg–Bamberg line of Deutsche Bahn.

Future
There are plans to upgrade and redesign the station for easier interchange between U1 and S1. In the course of those changes, the station is to be renamed "Klinikum" to make the link to the U-Bahn station of the same name more apparent.

References

Railway stations in Bavaria
Unterfarrnbach